Wiang Phang Kham is a subdistrict (tambon) of Mae Sai District, in Chiang Rai Province, Thailand. In 2012 it had a population of 20,252 people.

Administration
The subdistrict is divided into 10 administrative villages (mubans).

The area of the subdistrict is shared by two local governmental units. The subdistrict municipality Mae Sai covers the northeastern part of the subdistrict, parts of the villages one, two, three and ten. The remaining area of the subdistrict is covered by the Wiang Phang Kham Subdistrict Municipality.

References

External links
ThaiTambon.com
Website of Wiang Phang Kham municipality

Tambon of Chiang Rai province
Populated places in Chiang Rai province